Dmitri Vladimirovich Kalinin (born July 22, 1980) is a Russian professional ice hockey defenceman who is currently an unrestricted free agent. He most recently played for Traktor Chelyabinsk of the Kontinental Hockey League (KHL).

Playing career
He was drafted by the Sabres 18th overall in the 1998 NHL Entry Draft. He had an injury plagued 2005–06 season, but did not miss a game in the 2006–07 season. He scored the NHL's first goal in the 2006–07 season, at 9:09 of the first period in the season opener at the Carolina Hurricanes.

Kalinin became an unrestricted free agent July 1, 2008 and two days later signed a one-year contract with the New York Rangers.

On March 4, 2009, Kalinin was traded to the Phoenix Coyotes along with Petr Průcha and Nigel Dawes for Derek Morris. On July 21, 2009, Kalinin signed a two-year contract with the Salavat Yulaev Ufa of the Kontinental Hockey League (KHL).

Kalinin was named a member of Russia's hockey team for the 2010 Winter Olympics in Vancouver, British Columbia.

Kalinin had a successful two seasons with Salavat before signing with SKA St. Petersburg. He continued his success in the KHL with SKA and gained recognition as one of the most feared defensemen in the KHL. He won KHL Defenseman of the Month multiple times, was 2nd in KHL defensemen scoring in the 2011–12 season. Prior to the beginning of the 2012–13 season, he was named St. Petersburg's captain, after being a major factor in his team's Gagarin Cup victory the season before. His only season as captain was a success in returning SKA to the playoffs.

On July 2, 2016 Kalinin signed a one-year contract with Spartak Moscow. Kalinin remained with Spartak for three years, captaining the club in the 2018–19 season, with 11 points in 50 games from the blueline.

On May 6, 2019, Kalinin as a free agent continued his career by returning to hometown club, Traktor Chelyabinsk, on a one-year contract.

Career statistics

Regular season and playoffs

International

References

External links

1980 births
Buffalo Sabres draft picks
Buffalo Sabres players
Metallurg Magnitogorsk players
Ice hockey players at the 2010 Winter Olympics
Living people
Moncton Wildcats players
National Hockey League first-round draft picks
New York Rangers players
Olympic ice hockey players of Russia
Rochester Americans players
Russian ice hockey defencemen
Salavat Yulaev Ufa players
SKA Saint Petersburg players
HC Spartak Moscow players
Sportspeople from Chelyabinsk
Traktor Chelyabinsk players